Gabriel Acosta Bendek (18 June 1931 – 10 August 2014) was a Colombian physician and politician. He served as member of the 
Senate of Colombia during three terms, from 1994 to 2010. He was affiliated to the National Conservative Movement (1998–2002), the Movimiento Nacional (2002–06) and the Citizens' Convergence (2006–10).

References

1931 births
2014 deaths
People from Magdalena Department
Members of the Senate of Colombia
Citizens' Convergence politicians